The Railway Gazette Group is a family of print and online business publications for the world rail transport industry. Based in Sutton, London, it is part of DVV Media Group, and forms part of the Hamburg-based Deutsche Verkehrs Verlag international publishing group. 

 Railway Gazette International: English-language business magazine for railway, metro and light rail operators and suppliers.
 Railway Gazette International Chinese Edition – articles from Railway Gazette International translated into  Mandarin in association with the Institute of Scientific & Technical Information of China.
 Metro Report International: developments in the urban rail sector, ranging from tram and light rail to metro and suburban railway networks. 
 Rail Business UK: news from the UK railway industry.
 Railway Directory: an annual catalogue of industry references and contacts.	 
 Rail Business Intelligence: fortnightly newsletter which reported on the privatised UK railway industry.

See also 
 List of railroad-related periodicals

External links
 RailwayGazette.com

Rail transport publications